Carex schaffneri is a tussock-forming species of perennial sedge in the family Cyperaceae. It is native to central parts of Mexico.

See also
List of Carex species

References

schaffneri
Taxa named by Johann Otto Boeckeler
Plants described in 1878
Flora of Mexico